The 1983–84 Yugoslav Ice Hockey League season was the 42nd season of the Yugoslav Ice Hockey League, the top level of ice hockey in Yugoslavia. Eight teams participated in the league, and Olimpija have won the championship.

First round

Final round

Final
Jesenice – Olimpija 2–3 (4–6, 2–7, 2–0, 5–4, 2–3)

Placing round

External links
 Season on hokej.snt.cz

Yugoslav
Yugoslav Ice Hockey League seasons
1983–84 in Yugoslav ice hockey